James E. Casorio Jr. (born August 23, 1964 in Jeannette, Pennsylvania) is a former member of the Pennsylvania House of Representatives. He served as a Representative from 1997 to 2010.

He received a B.S. from Saint Vincent College (Latrobe, Pennsylvania) in 1994 and an M.A. degree from Saint Francis College (Loretto, Pennsylvania) in 1995.

References

Living people
Democratic Party members of the Pennsylvania House of Representatives
Saint Vincent College alumni
Saint Francis University alumni
1964 births
People from Jeannette, Pennsylvania